Anlo District is a former district council that was located in Volta Region, Ghana. Originally created as an ordinary district assembly in 1975. However, on 10 March 1989, it was split off into three new district assemblies: Keta District (capital: Keta), Ketu District (capital: Denu) and Akatsi District (capital: Akatsi). The district assembly was located in the southern part of Volta Region and had Keta as its capital town.

References

1989 disestablishments in Africa
Volta Region
Former districts of Ghana
States and territories disestablished in 1989